Misha Engel (born 1 October 2002) is a Dutch professional footballer who plays as a defender for Dutch club AZ Alkmaar.

Career
Engel made his league debut for Jong AZ in the Eerste Divisie on 23 August 2021 appearing as a substitute in a 1-0 victory against TOP Oss. He made his first start for Jong AZ against VVV Venlo in January 2022 after their team had endured four months without a win. Engel played at left back and along with Lewis Schouten and striker Mexx Meerdink was one of three young players making their first start. They won 2-0. After a succession of further appearances, in April 2022 Engel was granted a new professional contract with AZ, keeping him at the club until 2023. On 5 September, 2022 he scored his first professional goal, coming in a 3-1 win against FC Dordrecht.

References

2002 births
Living people
Eerste Divisie players
Jong AZ players
Dutch footballers
Association football defenders